Mister Philippines 2006 is a male pageant in the Philippines. The winner of Mister Philippines 2010, Ken Escudero represented the Philippines in the first edition for Mister International male pageant held in Singapore on October 7, 2006. 19 contestants from countries and territories competed for the crown.  Mister Philippines 2010 a Semi-finalist, took home the Mister Photogenic special Award.

See also
 Manhunt International
 Mister World

External links
 Mister Philippines website

Mister International